This is a list of women writers who were born in Palestine or whose writings are closely associated with that region.

A
Umayya Abu-Hanna (born 1961), Palestinian-Finnish journalist, columnist, novelist
Lama Abu-Odeh (born 1962), Palestinian-American educator, non-fiction writer
Refqa Abu-Remaileh (fl 2000s), academic and non-fiction writer
Susan Abulhawa (born 1970), Palestinian-American best selling novelist, human rights activist, author of Mornings in Jenin
Samira Azzam (1927–1967), short story writer, broadcaster, translator, political activist

B
Liana Badr (born 1950), novelist, short story writer
Ibtisam Barakat, Palestinian-American memoirist, poet, educator, author of Tasting the Sky: A Palestinian Childhood (2007)

D
Selma Dabbagh (born 1970), British-Palestinian short story writer, novelist, playwright with a strong focus on Palestine

E
Laila el-Haddad (born 1978), Kuwaiti-born Palestinian journalist, non-fiction writer
Noura Erakat, contemporary Palestinian-American legal scholar

F
Najwa Kawar Farah (1923–2015), educator, short story writer, playwright, children's writer, novelist
Leila Farsakh (born 1967), non-fiction writer, educator

G
Asma al-Ghul (born 1982), journalist

H
Nejmeh Khalil Habib (born 1946), novelist and non-fiction writer
Salha Hamadin Hans Christian Andersen Award winner
Suheir Hammad (born 1973), Palestinian-American poet, non-fiction writer
Sheikha Helawy (born 1968), Arabic short story writer and poet
Nadia Hijab (fl. 1988), Syrian-born Palestinian analyst, journalist, living in the United States
Huzama Habayeb (born 1965), Kuwaiti-born Palestinian novelist, short-story writer, columnist, poet, and translator

J
Annemarie Jacir (born 1974), filmmaker, poet
Salma Jayyusi (born c.1926), Jordanian-Palestinian poet, translator
Rula Jebreal (born 1973), journalist, novelist, screenwriter

K
Ghada Karmi (born 1939), doctor of medicine, non-fiction writer, columnist
Sahar Khalifeh (born 1942), novelist, feminist
Dima Khatib (born 1971), journalist

M
 Jean Said Makdisi (born 1940), autobiographical writer
Thurayyā Malḥas (1925–2013), poet and writer
 Amal Mansour (1950–2018), translator and writer

S
Rosemarie Said Zahlan (1937–2006), Palestinian-American historian, essayist, non-fiction writer
Serene Husseini Shahid (1920–2008), embroidery project leader, non-fiction writer
Deema Shehabi (born 1970), Palestinian-American poet

T
Raymonda Tawil (born 1940), journalist, poet
Fadwa Touqan (1917–2003), acclaimed poet, autobiographer

Z
May Ziadeh (1886–1941), Lebanese-Palestinian poet, essayist, journalist, salonist, translator

See also
List of women writers

References

-
Palestinian
Writers
Writers, women